The Haynie's Corner Arts District is a small area in Evansville's south-central side, adjacent to Downtown Evansville. Centered on Haynie's Corner, a small square, the district is resided mainly by artists and is one of the only areas in the city where residential showrooms are allowed.

The district is home to an art festival show with painters, sculptors, craftsmen, artisans, and musicians. It also hosts the Midwest Dragon Boat Racing Festival.

Geography of Evansville, Indiana
Tourist attractions in Evansville, Indiana
Arts districts